Amoebotaenia is a genus of tapeworms belonging to the family Dilepididae.

The genus has almost cosmopolitan distribution.

Species:

Amoebotaenia cuneata 
Amoebotaenia subterranea 
Amoebotaenia urotrichi 
Amoebotaenia vanelli

References

Cestoda